Daly at Night was an Australian television series which aired from 7 March 1962 to 29 March 1963, aired on Wednesdays, Thursdays and Fridays on Melbourne station HSV-7. Hosted by American-born Jonathan Daly, the series was an interview program. Other regulars on the series included Horrie Dargie, Vikki Hammond, Lou Richards, Frank Thring and Arthur Young. Daly was later co-star of another 1960s Australian series, variety show The Delo and Daly Show. 

In a highly critical review of the final episode, newspaper The Age said "It opened, brave in its inadequacy, with business as usual; some talk leading nowhere on the reported falling numbers of students seeking a higher musical education. But who among those still watching cared about these things on Daly at Night's final night?"

Information on the archival status of the series is not available.

References

External links
Daly at Night at IMDb
The Start of Something Big - 2015 Interview with Jonathan Daly, with discussion of Daly at Night

Seven Network original programming
1962 Australian television series debuts
1963 Australian television series endings
Black-and-white Australian television shows
English-language television shows
Australian live television series
Australian television talk shows